Saxa Vord distillery is a Scotch whisky and gin distillery on the island of Unst, part of the Shetland islands. The distillery takes its name from its location immediately south of RAF Saxa Vord, an RAF station and headland. The distillery buildings are adjacent to the SaxaVord Spaceport.

It is the most northerly distillery in the United Kingdom. The distillery is the first legal distillery on the Shetland Islands and the first ever legal whisky in Shetland.

History
The distillery company was first established in 2012 by Wilma and Stuart Nickerson (formerly of William Grant & Sons), and Frank and Debbie Strang. By 2013, plans proposed modifying former RAF buildings at Saxa Vord to house the distillery. The first gin was produced in August 2015 and the first blended whisky released in November 2015.

Products
The distillery produces drinks under the Shetland Reel brand. Their standard products include an island-distilled gin and a blended Single malt whisky. The gin is made with botanicals include apple mint.

The company exports its products to numerous countries, including the US, Canada and Sweden.

The distillery has also produced a limited cask-aged gin.

References

Gins
Scottish malt whisky
Distilleries in Scotland